This is a list of Danish television related events from 1972.

Events

Debuts

Television shows

Ending this year

Births
1 June - Stine Stengade, actress
15 August - Lisbeth Janniche, journalist & TV host
30 August - Kaya Brüel, singer-songwriter & actress
11 November - Camilla Ottesen, TV host

Deaths

See also
1972 in Denmark